Clarinda may refer to:

Given name
Clarinda (poet), Peruvian poet who wrote in the early 17th century
Clarinda Sinnige (born 1973), former field hockey goalkeeper from the Netherlands
Clarinda the Christian Missionary, Christian missionary and a social worker in Palayamkottai, Tirunelveli, South India in the 18th century
Clarinda, name given by Scottish poet Robert Burns to Agnes Maclehose (1758–1841)
Clarinda, a major character in The Virtuoso, a play first produced in 1676
Clarinda, a major character in The Lovers' Progress, an early 17th-century  play
Clarinda, a character in The Deserving Favourite, another early 17th-century play
Clarinda, a character in the play The Sea Voyage, licensed for performance in 1622
Clarinda, a 1948 novel by Vicki Baum, also published as Headless Angel

Places
Clarinda, Victoria, a suburb of the Australian city of Melbourne
Clarinda, Iowa, a city and county seat in the United States
Clarinda, Alberta, an unincorporated community in Canada

Other uses
USS Clarinda (SP-185), later YP-185, a United States Navy patrol vessel in commission from 1917 to 1930

See also
Clorinda (disambiguation)

Feminine given names